Novaya Otrada is a rural locality (a village) in Otradinsky Selsoviet, Kuyurgazinsky District, Bashkortostan, Russia. The population was 129 as of 2010. There are 2 streets.

Geography 
Novaya Otrada is located 11 km south of Yermolayevo (the district's administrative centre) by road. Otrada Bashkirskaya is the nearest rural locality.

References 

Rural localities in Kuyurgazinsky District